Rafael Santos is a Portuguese name, may refer to:

Rafael Santos Torroella (1914–2002), Spanish art critic and poet
Rafael Santos (athlete) (born 1944), Salvadoran Olympic sprinter
Rafael Santos (footballer, born 1984), Brazilian football centre-back
Rafael Santos (footballer, born 1989), Brazilian football goalkeeper
Rafael Santos (footballer, born 1995), Brazilian football midfielder
Rafael Santos (footballer, born 1997), Portuguese football midfielder
Rafael Santos (footballer, born 2 February 1998), Brazilian footballer
Rafael Santos (footballer, born 5 February 1998), Brazilian footballer

See also
Rafael (footballer, born 1979), full name Rafael da Silva Santos, Brazilian football defender
Coutinho (footballer, born 1984), full name Rafael Coutinho Barcellos dos Santos, Brazilian football defensive midfielder